Kurdistan Institution for Strategic Studies and Scientific Research (KISSR) (دەستەى كوردستانى بۆ دراساتى ستراتيجى و توێژينەوەى زانستى) is a public institution located in the city of Sulaymaniyah in Kurdistan Region - Iraq. It is one of the important scientific and cultural institution in Kurdistan region as well as Iraq which is specialized for scientific research and strategy studies.

The aim of Kurdistan Institution for Strategic Studies and Scientific Research (KISSR) are to conduct researches in the fields of pure sciences, engineering, medical sciences, and strategic studies.

History 
Kurdistan Institution for Strategic Studies and Scientific Research (KISSR) was founded in 2005 under the name of Kurdistan Technology and Research Centres with the support of Kurdistan Regional Government and the Ministry of Higher Education and Scientific Research. In the late of 2008, it was re-established under the name of Kurdistan Institution for Strategic Studies and Scientific Research (KISSR).

Research centers 
There are currently four active research centers in Kurdistan Institution in variety of fields, which are:

Directorates and departments 
In addition, In addition, Kurdistan Institution includes the following directorates and departments:
 Directorate of Information technology
 Directorate of Health and Safety
 Directorate of Anti-fascism and Terrorism
 Department of Academic Journals and Magazines
 Department of Postgraduate Studies
 Department of Relations
 Department of Quality Assurance
 Department of Media

References

External links
Kurdistan Institution for Strategic Studies and Scientific Research (KISSR) website

Sulaymaniyah
Research institutes in Iraq